Nebria tiani is a species of ground beetle in the Nebriinae subfamily that is endemic to Guangxi, province of China.

References

tiani
Beetles described in 2003
Beetles of Asia
Endemic fauna of Guangxi